Samuel Standfield Wagstaff Jr. (born 21 February 1945) is an American mathematician and computer scientist, whose research interests are in the areas of cryptography, parallel computation, and analysis of algorithms, especially number theoretic algorithms. He is currently a professor of computer science and mathematics at Purdue University who coordinates the Cunningham project, a project to factor numbers of the form bn ± 1, since 1983. He has authored/coauthored over 50 research papers and three books. He has an Erdős number of 1.

Wagstaff received his Bachelor of Science in 1966 from Massachusetts Institute of Technology. His doctoral dissertation was titled, On Infinite Matroids, PhD in 1970 from Cornell University.

Wagstaff was one of the founding faculty of Center for Education and Research in Information Assurance and Security (CERIAS) at Purdue, and its precursor, the Computer Operations, Audit, and Security Technology (COAST) Laboratory.

Selected publications
 with John Brillhart, D. H. Lehmer, John L. Selfridge, Bryant Tuckerman: Factorization of bn ± 1, b = 2,3,5,6,7,10,11,12 up to high powers, American Mathematical Society, 1983, 3rd edition 2002 as electronic book, Online text 
 Cryptanalysis of number theoretic ciphers, CRC Press 2002
 with Carlos J. Moreno: Sums of Squares of Integers, CRC Press 2005
 The Joy of Factoring, Student Mathematical Library (American Mathematical Society) 2013
 Wagstaff The Cunningham Project, Fields Institute, pdf file

References

External links
Cunningham project website
CERIAS WWW site
Archival COAST WWW site

Number theorists
Cornell University alumni
20th-century American mathematicians
21st-century American mathematicians
Living people
1945 births
Massachusetts Institute of Technology alumni